The discography of Superchunk, including studio albums, singles, compilations and videos.

Albums

7" singles and EPs

CD singles and EPs

Digital singles

Compilations/Soundtracks

Videos

Discographies of American artists
Rock music group discographies